Glasford is a village in Peoria County, Illinois, United States. The population was 1,022 at the 2010 census. Glasford is part of the Peoria, Illinois Metropolitan Statistical Area.

History
Glasford or Glasco as it was called in 1868, was named for its founder, Samual Alexander Glasford/Glassford (1824-1896).

Samuel A. Glasford whom arrived in Peoria County in 1842 from Ohio and was one of the early settlers of Timber Twp., had the foresight to off lots where cornfields once stood.  When the railroad was built by his farm residence, Mr. Glasford had the hindsight to realize Lancaster, IL would seek the railroad and laid out the town December 9, 1868 which became incorporated as a village in 1889.  Glasco would become a center of trade and population along the new route of the Toledo, Peoria and Warsaw Railroad, bringing many new settlers and stores to Glasco in 1868.

The town has been called by many names in different publications; Glasford, Glassford, Glasco, and Glasgow, just as his name in Scotland where is father, Lord William Glasford was born, is Glassford but in America it was written as Glasford.

Geography
Glasford is located at  (40.571714, -89.812707).

Glasford is located near the "Glasford Disturbance", an area in which the normal layering of the bedrock has been highly disturbed. This is believed to be an ancient meteor crater known as the Glasford crater. The impact fractured the bedrock, and upended large blocks of sedimentary rocks. The crater has been completely filled by glacial action, so that no trace appears on the surface.

Demographics

As of the census of 2000, there were 1,076 people, 426 households, and 311 families residing in the village. The racial makeup of the village was 99.44% White, 0.09% Native American, 0.19% from other races, and 0.28% from two or more races. Hispanic or Latino of any race were 1.02% of the population.

There were 426 households, out of which 32.9% had children under the age of 18 living with them, 58.5% were married couples living together, 10.6% had a female householder with no husband present, and 26.8% were non-families. 23.0% of all households were made up of individuals, and 12.4% had someone living alone who was 65 years of age or older. The average household size was 2.53 and the average family size was 2.94.

In the village, the population was spread out, with 24.3% under the age of 18, 10.2% from 18 to 24, 28.4% from 25 to 44, 24.3% from 45 to 64, and 12.6% who were 65 years of age or older. The median age was 36 years. For every 100 females, there were 90.8 males. For every 100 females age 18 and over, there were 87.6 males.

The median income for a household in the village was $37,019, and the median income for a family was $46,818. Males had a median income of $37,250 versus $21,188 for females. The per capita income for the village was $16,754. About 5.4% of families and 7.1% of the population were below the poverty line, including 6.7% of those under age 18 and 5.2% of those age 65 or over.

Glasford is located in the Illini Bluffs Unit School District 327, and is home to the Illini Bluffs Elementary School, Illini Bluffs Middle School, and Illini Bluffs High School.

References

External links
 Village of Glasford Web Site

Villages in Peoria County, Illinois
Villages in Illinois
Peoria metropolitan area, Illinois